Isaac Mayo (1794–1861) was a US Navy officer.

Isaac Mayo may also refer to:
 Isaac Mayo (Surfman USCG), saved lives in the 19th-century Coast Guard
 USCGC Isaac Mayo (WPC-1112), the 12th Sentinel-class cutter, named after a Coast Guard hero

Mayo, Isaac